Palavathankattalai is a village in the Kumbakonam taluk of Thanjavur district, Tamil Nadu, India.

Demographics 

As per the 2001 census, Palavathankattalai had a total population of 5596 with 2811 males and 2785 females. The sex ratio was 991. The literacy rate was 85.37

References 

 

Villages in Thanjavur district